The 2012 Rugby Super League season was the seventeenth and final season of the Rugby Super League, the United States premier division of rugby union, before being replaced by the USA Rugby Elite Cup. The regular season commenced on March 10, 2012. On May 19, 2012, the regular season ended, and was followed by the playoffs, for which the top four clubs qualified.

The defending champions and premiers were the San Francisco Golden Gate. New York Athletic Club RFC won both the regular season and the playoffs.

Participating clubs

Standings

Red Conference

Blue Conference 

4 Points awarded to the winning team
0 Points to the losing team
2 Points to each team in the case of a tie
1 Bonus Point to a team scoring 4 or more tries
1 Bonus Point to a losing team keeping the score within 7 points

Play-offs

External links 
 

Rugby Super League (United States)
Super league
Super League